Sham is a lost 1921 American silent romantic drama directed by Thomas N. Heffron and starring Ethel Clayton and Theodore Roberts. The film is based on the 1905 play of the same name written by Elmer Harris and Geraldine Bonner, and was adapted for the screen by Douglas Z. Doty.

Plot
Based upon a description in a film publication, Katherine Van Riper (Clayton) is an extravagant young society girl who is very much in debt, and her wealthy aunts and uncle refuse to give her any money. Katherine is desperate enough that she is considering marrying the wealthy Montee Buck (Hiers), although she is in love with the westerner Tom Jaffrey (Fillmore), who says he is poor. Finally, Katherine decides to sell the famous Van Riper pearls, pay off her debts, and marry Tom. However, upon examination the jewelry turns out to be paste, with her father having sold the genuine pearls several years earlier before his death. Montee is assured by the aunts that Katherine will marry him and tells this to Tom. Tom is about to leave town when Uncle James (Ricketts) steps in and pays off Katherine's debts, leaving the niece free to marry Tom.

Cast
Ethel Clayton as Katherine Van Riper
Clyde Fillmore as Tom Jaffrey
Theodore Roberts as Jeriamiah Buck
Sylvia Ashton as Aunt Bella
Walter Hiers as Montee Buck
Helen Dunbar as Aunt Louisa
Arthur Edmund Carewe as Bolton
Tom Ricketts as Uncle James
Blanche Gray as Clementine Vickers
Eunice Burnham as Maud Buck
Carrie Clark Ward as Rosie

References

External links

 
 

1921 films
1921 romantic drama films
American romantic drama films
American silent feature films
Famous Players-Lasky films
Lost American films
American films based on plays
American black-and-white films
Paramount Pictures films
Films directed by Thomas N. Heffron
1920s American films
Silent romantic drama films
Silent American drama films